RK Sloga Požega is a Serbian handball team located in Požega. They compete in Serbian Handball Super League.

European record

Team

Current squad
Squad for the 2016–17 season

Goalkeepers
 Branko Dimitrijevic
 Janko Gemaljevic
 Borislav Vladisavljevic

Wingers
RW
  Milan Knezevic
  Miroslav Marjanovic
LW 
  Djordje Spasic
  Ivan Voksi
Line players 
  Zeljko Jacimovic
  Nikolas Jestrovic

Back players
  Nemanja Gojkovic
  Dragoslav Ilic
  Ljubomir Janicijevic 
  Mladen Krsmancic
  Darko Milenkovic 
  Aleksandar Milicevic 
  Antonije Pavic
  Milan Pavlovic
  Predrag Rodic
  Vuk Stevanovic
  Filip Stojcic

External links
EHF club profile

Serbian handball clubs
Požega, Serbia